Korangi Town lies in the eastern part of the city that was named after the locality of Korangi. Korangi Town was formed in 2001 as part of The Local Government Ordinance 2001, and was subdivided into 9 union councils. The town system was disbanded in 2011, and Korangi Town was re-organized as part of Karachi East District, before Korangi District was formed.

History 
The federal government under introduced local government reforms in the year 2000, which eliminated the previous "third tier of government" (administrative divisions) and replaced it with the fourth tier (districts). The effect in Karachi was the dissolution of the former Karachi Division, and the merging of its five districts to form a new Karachi City-District with eighteen autonomous constituent towns including Korangi Town. In 2011, the system was disbanded but remained in place for bureaucratic administration until 2015, when the Karachi Metropolitan Corporation system was reintroduced. In 2015, Korangi Town was re-organized as part of Karachi East, before it was made part of Korangi District.

Hospital and Healthcare 
 Creek General Hospital
 Indus Hospital
 LRBT Free Tertiary Eye Hospital Korangi 
 Sultan General Hospital Korangi
 Chiniot General Hospital Korangi

Universities
 United Medical & Dental College
 Shaheed Zulfiqar Ali Bhutto University of Law

Neighbourhoods of Korangi Town 
Note: The town of Korangi should not be confused with Korangi neighbourhood in neighbouring Landhi Town.

See also 

 Korangi
 Korangi Town
 Korangi District
 Korangi J Area
 Korangi Industrial Area
 Korangi Creek Cantonment
 Korangi (disambiguation)
 Korangi railway station

References

External links 
 Karachi Website
 Korangi Town

 
Korangi District
Towns in Karachi